Chapak or Chepak may refer to:
 Chapak-e Nazemi Mahalleh
 Chapak-e Shafi Mahalleh
 Chapak Rud